Chuyunchi (Suyınsı) is a rural locality (a selo) and the administrative centre of Chuyunchinsky Selsoviet, Davlekanovsky District, Bashkortostan, Russia. The population was 475 as of 2010. There are 7 streets.

Geography 
Chuyunchi is located 32 km southeast of Davlekanovo (the district's administrative centre) by road. Chuyunchi-Nikolayevka is the nearest rural locality.

References 

Rural localities in Davlekanovsky District